Patrick Fa'apale (born 3 May 1991) is a rugby union fly-half who plays for Vaiala and  Samoa.
Fa’apale made his debut for Samoa in 2014 and was part of the squad at the 2015 Rugby World Cup.

References

External links

Living people
Samoa international rugby union players
1991 births
Rugby union fly-halves